Rathaus (German for "town hall bridge", may refer to the following structure:

 Rathausbrücke, Berlin, a bridge crossing the river Spree in Berlin, Germany
 Rathausbrücke, Erfurt, a bridge crossing a branch of the river Gera in Erfurt, Germany
 Rathausbrücke, Zürich, a pedestrian bridge crossing the river Limmat in Zürich, Switzerland